Memphis is a census-designated place (CDP) in Clark County, Indiana, United States. The population was 695 at the 2010 census.

History 
A post office established at Memphis in 1854.  The original settlers were from Memphis, Tennessee.

2012 tornado outbreak 

On March 2, 2012, a tornado between Henryville and Memphis damaged 15 homes on Broadway.  Homes were also damaged on Stricker Rd.  Volunteers from as far as Germany and Singapore went to Memphis to help.

Geography
Memphis is located at  (38.487110, -85.764223).

Demographics

As of the census of 2000, there were 400 people, 157 households, and 121 families residing in the CDP. The racial makeup of the CDP was 98.50% White, 0.50% Native American, 0.25% Pacific Islander, and 0.75% from two or more races.

There were 157 households, out of which 29.3% had children under the age of 18 living with them, 56.7% were married couples living together, 14.6% had a female householder with no husband present, and 22.3% were non-families. 19.1% of all households were made up of individuals, and 8.3% had someone living alone who was 65 years of age or older. The average household size was 2.55 and the average family size was 2.89.

In the CDP, the population was spread out, with 23.0% under the age of 18, 9.0% from 18 to 24, 28.0% from 25 to 44, 26.8% from 45 to 64, and 13.3% who were 65 years of age or older. The median age was 39 years. For every 100 females, there were 86.9 males. For every 100 females age 18 and over, there were 87.8 males.

The median income for a household in the CDP was $35,658, and the median income for a family was $41,528. Males had a median income of $31,250 versus $24,688 for females. The per capita income for the CDP was $20,054. About 5.9% of families and 5.9% of the population were below the poverty line, including none of those under the age of eighteen or sixty-five or over.

References 

Census-designated places in Clark County, Indiana
Census-designated places in Indiana
Louisville metropolitan area